Cephonodes kingii, the gardenia bee hawk, is a moth of the family Sphingidae.

Distribution 
It is found in the northern two thirds of Australia.

Description 
The wingspan is about 40 mm. Adults resemble bumble bees. They are mostly green with a yellow abdomen and a black band around the first few abdominal segments, and a dark mark on the next segment. There is a black fringe around the tip of the abdomen. The wings are mostly transparent except for an opaque area near the tip of the forewings.

Biology 
Adults feed on flower nectar.

The larvae have been recorded on Gardenia jasminoides, Canthium attenuatum, Canthium coprosmoides, Canthium odoratum, Canthium oleifolium, Gardenia ovularis, Gardenia ochreata, Pavetta australiensis, Medicago sativa and Citrus limon. Young larvae are pale green with a short black tail horn. Later, they become black, grey, or green, often with black lines across the back. They have a posterior horn shaped like a shallow S, and have white spiracles along each side outlined in red. The head colour varies from brown to green. Pupation takes place underground in a dark brown pupa.

References

Cephonodes
Moths described in 1826